St Peter's Church is an Anglican Church and the parish church of Raunds. It is a Grade I listed building and stands in an elevated position in Church Street.

The present building is thought to be on the site of an earlier place of worship. The majority of the existing structure was erected between the 12th and 14th centuries, the walls being constructed of limestone with ashlar dressings. Though claimed to be 202 feet high, the spire height, according to a 2011 survey by architect Julian Flannery, is actually 176 feet (54 metres) high.

The bowl of the 13th-century circular font is decorated with a carving of a ram's head. A brass on the floor commemorates John Tawyer (died 1470) and his wife Margaret. There is a tomb-chest dedicated to John Wales, vicar from 1447 to 1496. In the south chapel are monuments to Robert Gage (died 1606) and William Gage of Magilligan, Ireland (died 1632). A number of other substantial monuments and also medieval wall paintings survive within the building. The church features a rare 'left-handed fiddler' decoration above the western entrance.

Until the 15th century the dedication of the church was to St Mary but the dedication now used is to St Peter.

The interior was restored in 1874 and 1878 by Sir Gilbert Scott; this involved the removal of a west gallery and alterations to the chancel.

The three-manual organ was built by  Peter Conacher and was one of the largest organs by Conacher of Huddersfield. It was donated in 1893 by John King–Smith, a prominent boot manufacturer in Raunds and was most recently restored in 2006.

In 2007, Raunds, Hargrave, Ringstead and Stanwick were legally united as "The 4 Spires Benefice", with each village retaining its own church.

Notes

Grade I listed churches in Northamptonshire
12th-century church buildings in England
14th-century church buildings in England
Saint Peter
Church of England church buildings in Northamptonshire